Dennis Cordell-Lavarack (1 August 1943 – 18 February 1995), known as Denny Cordell, was an English record producer. He is notable for his mid-1960s and early 1970s productions of hit singles for The Moody Blues, Leon Russell, The Move, Procol Harum, Joe Cocker and Tom Petty and the Heartbreakers.

Early life and career
Born in Buenos Aires, Argentina, Cordell grew up in England and was educated at Cranleigh School.

He met Chris Blackwell when he was aged twenty-one, and started to work for Blackwell's label, Island Records, as a producer. When Cordell started to work more closely with The Moody Blues, he decided to leave Island and become an independent producer.

Cordell produced the Moody Blues' debut album The Magnificent Moodies on the Decca record label in 1965. The record contained the hit "Go Now" (produced separately by Alex Wharton), which had been a #1 hit on the UK Singles Chart earlier in the year. This was followed up with hits for Cordell producing The Move, Georgie Fame, Procol Harum and Joe Cocker (all but Fame were Essex/Straight Ahead Productions artists). On the back of his success with Procol Harum's "A Whiter Shade of Pale" and Joe Cocker's "With a Little Help From My Friends", Cordell moved his operation to Los Angeles and started Shelter Records, with session piano player Leon Russell. A second Shelter Records location opened in Tulsa, Oklahoma, at The Church Studio, an old church turned into a recording studio by Leon Russell now owned by American businesswoman Teresa Knox.

He enjoyed success with Shelter, signing J. J. Cale, Phoebe Snow, Leon Russell, Joe Cocker, and Tom Petty and the Heartbreakers, amongst others. He is also known as an early mentor of Tony Visconti.

In the late 1970s he started the Flippers roller skating boogie palace in Los Angeles, California. In the 1980s he turned to his other interest, horseracing, but in the 1990s he took up producing records again, and once more worked for Island. Among others he helped produce The Cranberries, who wrote a song in his tribute called "Cordell" (1996), and Melissa Etheridge's album Yes I Am.

Death 
Cordell died in February 1995 in Dublin, Ireland from lymphoma at the age of 51.

Legacy 
He was the father of the musicians Tarka Cordell, and Milo Cordell of the band The Big Pink. A horse race, the Denny Cordell Lavarack Fillies Stakes, is run annually in Cordell's memory at Gowran Park Racecourse, where he saddled his first winner as a racehorse trainer.

See also
Regal Zonophone Records
Fly Records
Shelter Records
Island Records

References

External links

1943 births
1995 deaths
People educated at Cranleigh School
English record producers
Deaths from lymphoma
English expatriates in the United States
Argentine emigrants to the United Kingdom
English people of Argentine descent
Deaths from cancer in the Republic of Ireland
Irish racehorse trainers
American record producers
American racehorse trainers
20th-century British businesspeople